Arthur F. Turner was president of the Optical Society of America in 1968. He is well known for his contributions to the field of optical thin-film coatings. He was awarded the Technical Oscar in 1959 for the Balcold projection mirror, and the Frederic Ives Medal in 1971.

See also
Optical Society of America#Past Presidents of the OSA

References

External links
 Articles Published by early OSA Presidents  Journal of the Optical Society of America

Presidents of Optica (society)
21st-century American physicists
Living people
Year of birth missing (living people)
Optical physicists